Elbeyli District is a district of Kilis Province of Turkey. Its seat is the town Elbeyli. It had a total population of 5,594 in 2022.

References

Districts of Kilis Province